Carmel Bakurski (née Souter; born 7 September 1976 in Murray Bridge, South Australia) is a retired female field hockey defender from Australia. She made her debut for the Australia women's national field hockey team during the 1998 season (Argentina Tour) following the 1997 Junior World Cup (silver medal).

Nicknamed Carma she was a member of the Hockeyroos at the 2002 Commonwealth Games in Manchester where the team ended up in third place in the overall-rankings, and the 2004 Summer Olympics in Athens.

Hockey

State Hockey
Carmel played for the SA Suns in the Australian Hockey League.

International Hockey
Carmel played international games for the Hockeyroos, including Champions Trophy, Commonwealth Games, Olympic Games and World Cup.

Her tournaments include:
 2001 Women's Hockey Champions Trophy (Amstelveen) – 3rd BRONZE
 2002 Women's Hockey Champions Trophy (Macau) – 4th
 2002 Commonwealth Games (Manchester) – 1st GOLD
 2002 Women's Hockey World Cup (Perth) – 4th
 2003 Women's Hockey Champions Trophy (Sydney) – 1st GOLD
 2004 Summer Olympics (Athens) – 5th

References

External links
 

1976 births
Living people
Australian female field hockey players
Olympic field hockey players of Australia
Field hockey players at the 2002 Commonwealth Games
Field hockey players at the 2004 Summer Olympics
Commonwealth Games bronze medallists for Australia
People from Murray Bridge, South Australia
Commonwealth Games medallists in field hockey
21st-century Australian women
Sportswomen from South Australia
Field hockey people from South Australia
Medallists at the 2002 Commonwealth Games